The Possessed is a 2009 documentary style horror film which was released to DVD in May 2009 and had its television debut in October that same year on SyFy.

Plot 
The film is based upon the events surrounding what became known as the 'Watseka Wonder'. Using period photographs, dramatic recreations, and interviews with subject experts, it addresses what is allegedly the first well-documented and recorded spirit possession story in America of 1877, and the subsequent recorded "possessions" suffered by Lurancy.

Beginning in 2006, and using the assistance of members of the Studio Nine class of Watseka Community High School, The Possessed was shot on locations in Watseka, Illinois, in the actual homes of, and including interviews of, the remaining family members of Lurancy Vennum.  The filmmakers included a repeat of an original 100-year-old séance, but were able to include modern measuring instruments. They also used footage of individuals themselves alleged to be possessed.

The film dramatically recreates the alleged events.  After years of violent and self-destructive behavior, a young Mary Roff from Watseka, Illinois was committed to an asylum in Peoria, Illinois, and on July 5, 1865, she died. Twelve years later, a Watseka girl named Lurancy Vennum began exhibiting the same behavior as had Mary. When Asa Roff, a devout spiritist, heard of the incident, and believing that the spirit of his deceased daughter Mary has possessed Lurancy, he convinced the Vennum family to not commit their own daughter.  Lurancy Vennum moved in with the Asa Roff family in 1878 and lived with them for several days. There she was examined by a spiritist, Dr. E. W. Stevens, who wrote about the case, and upon whose journals the film was based.

Cast

Interviewees 
 Christopher Saint Booth, filmmaker
 Philip Adrian Booth, filmmaker
 John Zaffis, demonologist
 Troy Taylor, ghost writer
 Keith Age, ghost hunter
 Rosemary Ellen Guiley Ph.D, paranormal author
 Bill Chappell, inventor
 Denice Jones, author, The Other Side
 Steven LaChance, author, The Uninvited
 James Long, bishop
 Rob Johnson, Manteno historian
 Dewi Morgaine, herself as possessed girl
 Scott Anderson, Vennum House owner
 Anita Tall Bull, herself
 Marcus Tall Bull, possessed
 John Whitman, Roff House owner
 Rick Hayes, himself
 Janet Pierce, grandmother
 Michael Jones, "The Sixth Sense" boy
 Kathy Reno, Glore Psychiatric Museum

Re-enactment actors 
 Ava Belew as Lurancy Vennum
 Reenie Varga as Mrs. Roff
 Christina Molina as Mary Roff
 Matthew Udall as Dr. Stevens
 Gabriel Saint Booth as Young Michael

Reception 
Dread Central wrote that the writers covered the entire story of Mary Roff and Lurancy Vellum within their documentary, with their having traveled to Illinois to interview topic experts, historians, and surviving family members. The reviewer wrote "I was fascinated by the documentary" but stated that the latter day claimants to being possessed did not seem believable.

References

External links 
 
 

American ghost films
American documentary films
Films set in Illinois
2009 films
2009 horror films
Documentary films about the paranormal
2000s English-language films
2000s American films